Digges may refer to:

Digges (surname)

Places 
 Digges Islands, Nunavut, Canada
 Digges Sound, Nunavut, Canada
 Digges railway station, Digges, Manitoba, Canada

Other 
 Digges Amendment